Peter Dalby is a British figure skater who competed in ice dance.

Partnered with Janet Sawbridge, he won bronze at the 1972 European Figure Skating Championships.

Competitive highlights 
With Janet Sawbridge

References 

British male ice dancers
Year of birth missing (living people)
Living people